Eupterote liquidambaris is a moth in the family Eupterotidae. It was described by Rudolf Mell in 1930. It is found in China.

References

Moths described in 1930
Eupterotinae